The October Gallery is an art gallery in central London, established in 1979.

The October Gallery has shown the work of artists including El Anatsui, Rachid Koraïchi, Dominique Kouas, Romuald Hazoumè, Nnenna Okore, Laila Shawa and Kenji Yoshida. The gallery has promoted the Transvangarde movement and hosted talks, performances and seminars.

History
Founded in 1979, October Gallery is a charitable trust that is supported by sales of art, rental of the gallery's facilities, and grants from various funding bodies.

From its beginnings, the October Gallery has promoted the art and artists of the Transvangarde or trans-cultural avant-garde. The gallery has exhibited the work of artists from more than 65 different countries, and from regions that include Africa, Asia, Australia, the Americas, Europe, the Middle East, India and Oceania.

Recent shows have featured work by artists such as El Anatsui, James Barnor, Sokari Douglas Camp, Eddy Kamuanga Ilunga, Naomi Gakunga and Alexis Peskine.

References

External links
October Gallery website
 October Gallery at Artsy

1978 establishments in England
Contemporary art galleries in London
Art galleries established in 1978
Tourist attractions in the London Borough of Camden